Claude Provencher OAQ, OAA, AAPPQ, ARAC (RCA), FRIAC (Plessisville, June 11, 1949 – May 6, 2022) was a Canadian architect. In 1983, together with Michel Roy he founded the architecture firm Provencher_Roy in Montréal. He is considered one of the pioneers of modern urban architecture.

Biography 

Claude Provencher was born in Plessisvile, Québec in June, 1949. He graduated in Architecture from the University of Montréal in 1974. He went on to work for the architecture firm Papineau, Gérin-Lajoie, Leblanc Architectes, where he met his would-be partner Michel Roy. After 10 years in this firm, the two founded Provencher_Roy in 1983. Provencher led the practice as senior designer for four decades, taking it through a considerable number of architectural and urban design projects, and being recognized by more than 70 prizes and mentions.

In 2011, he contributed to the creation of the Conseil du patrimoine culturel du Québec (formerly the Commission of Cultural Property of Quebec). He also sat on the Advisory Committee on Planning, Design and Realty of the National Capital Commission in Ottawa (1996-2011), was a member of the Board of Directors of the Canadian Conference of the Arts; and of Heritage Montreal. He was also involved in numerous university committees and organizations dedicated to the promotion of excellence in architecture.

Relevant work 

He became known in the architecture world through the urban renewal project of the World Trade Centre Montreal.
Under his influence, Provencher_Roy won the title of best firm of the year in architecture in Canada, awarded by the Royal Architectural Institute of Canada in 2015,  as well as awards of excellence from the Governor General, the Canadian Architect and the Order of Architects of Quebec.

Distinctions 

 2000 Fellow of the Royal Architectural Institute of Canada
 2014 Fellow of the Royal Canadian Academy of Arts
 2021 Knight of the National Order of Quebec

References

External links 
 Provencher_Roy

1949 births
2022 deaths
Architects from Montreal
Knights of the National Order of Quebec
Members of the Royal Canadian Academy of Arts
Fellows of the Royal Architectural Institute of Canada